Crawling Valley Reservoir, or Barkenhouse Lake, is a reservoir in Alberta. The reservoir uses the existing Crawling Valley, which was depression created as a meltwater channel created during the letting of the Laurentide ice sheet at the end of the last ice age. Construction of dams and canals began in 1983, diverting some water from the Bow River via the North Branch Canal, starting just upstream of the Bassano Dam (southwest of the town of Bassano, to fill the reservoir.  The main drainage flowing from the Crawling Valley Reservoir flows through a continuation of the North Branch Canal, serving irrigation needs, with other outflow into the Matzhiwin Creek.

Lakes of Alberta
County of Newell